Dot matrix printing, sometimes called impact matrix printing, is a computer printing process in which ink is applied to a surface using a relatively low-resolution dot matrix for layout. Dot matrix printers typically use a print head that moves back and forth or in an up-and-down motion on the page and prints by impact, striking an ink-soaked cloth ribbon against the paper, much like the print mechanism on a typewriter or line printer. However, a dot matrix printer is able to print arbitrary patterns and not just specific characters.

The perceived quality of dot matrix printers depends on the vertical and horizontal resolution and the ability of the printer to overlap adjacent dots. 9-pin and 24-pin are common; this specifies the number of pins in a specific vertically aligned space. With 24-pin printers, the horizontal movement can slightly overlap dots, producing visually superior output (near letter quality or NLQ), usually at the cost of speed.

Dot matrix printing is typically distinguished from non-impact methods, such as inkjet, thermal, or laser printing, though they too may use a bitmap to represent the printed work. It is also able to employ endless printing using continuous paper fanfolded with perforations for each page to be easily torn from each other.

History 

In 1925, Rudolf Hell invented the Hellschreiber, an early facsimile-like dot matrix-based teletypewriter device, patented in 1929.

Between 1952 and 1954 Fritz Karl Preikschat filed five patent applications for his teletype writer 7 stylus 35 dot matrix aka PKT printer, a dot matrix teletypewriter built between 1954 and 1956 in Germany. Like the earlier Hellschreiber, it still used electromechanical means of coding and decoding, but it used a start-stop method (asynchronous transmission) rather than synchronous transmission for communication. In 1956, while he was employed at Telefonbau und Normalzeit GmbH (TuN, later called Tenovis), the device was offered to the Deutsche Bundespost (German Post Office), which did not show interest.
When Preikschat emigrated into the US in 1957 he sold the rights to utilize the applications in any countries (except for the USA) to TuN. The prototype was also shown to General Mills in 1957. An improved transistorized design became the basis for a portable dot matrix facsimile machine, which was prototyped and evaluated for military use by Boeing around 1966–1967.

IBM marketed its first dot matrix printer in 1957, the same year that the dye-sublimation printer entered the market.

In 1968, the Japanese manufacturer OKI introduced its first serial impact dot matrix printer (SIDM), the OKI Wiredot. The printer supported a character generator for 128 characters with a print matrix of 7×5. It was aimed at governmental, financial, scientific and educational markets. For this achievement, OKI received an award from the Information Processing Society of Japan (IPSJ) in 2013.

In 1970 Digital Equipment Corporation (DEC) introduced an impact dot matrix printer, the LA30, as did Centronics (then of Hudson, New Hampshire): the Centronics 101. The search for a reliable printer mechanism led it to develop a relationship with Brother Industries, Ltd of Japan, and the sale of Centronics-badged Brother printer mechanisms equipped with a Centronics print head and Centronics electronics. Unlike Digital, Centronics concentrated on the low-end line printer marketplace with their distinctive units. In the process, they designed the parallel electrical interface that was to become standard on most printers until it began to be replaced by the Universal Serial Bus (USB) in the late 1990s. The Apple ImageWriter was a popular consumer dot  matrix printer in the 1980s until the mid 1990s.

In the 1970s and 1980s, dot matrix printers were generally considered the best combination of expense and versatility, and until the 1990s they were by far the most common form of printer used with personal and home computers.

Another manufacturer of Matrix Printers is Tally. 
Tally was a leading American manufacturer of printers. Founded in 1949 in Kent, Washington, United States by Philip Renshaw, the company was a leading manufacturer of punch tape readers. In 1970 Tally developed line matrix printer technologies and became a leader in the printer industry.
Tally was succeeded by TallyGenicom and also TallyGenicom is succeeded by Tally Dascom since 2010.

Design 

Dot matrix printing uses a print head that moves back-and-forth, or in an up-and-down motion, on the page and prints by impact, striking an ink-soaked cloth ribbon against the paper, much like the print mechanism on a typewriter. However, unlike a typewriter or daisy wheel printer, letters are drawn out of a dot matrix, and thus, varied fonts and arbitrary graphics can be produced.

Each dot is produced by a tiny metal rod, also called a "wire" or "pin", which is driven forward by the power of a tiny electromagnet or solenoid, either directly or through small levers (pawls). Facing the ribbon and the paper is a small guide plate named ribbon mask holder or protector, sometimes also called butterfly for its typical shape. It is pierced with holes to serve as guides for the pins. The plate may be made of hard plastic or an artificial jewel such as sapphire or ruby.

The portion of the printer that contains the pin is called the print head. When running the printer, it generally prints one line of text at a time. The printer head is attached to a metal bar that ensures correct alignment, but horizontal positioning is controlled by a band that attaches to sprockets on two wheels at each side which is then driven with an electric motor. This band may be made of stainless steel, phosphor bronze or beryllium copper alloys, nylon or various synthetic materials with a twisted nylon core to prevent stretching.  Actual position can be found out either by dead count using a stepper motor, rotary encoder attached to one wheel or a transparent plastic band with markings that is read by an optical sensor on the printer head (common on inkjets).

Because the printing involves mechanical pressure, dot matrix printers can create carbon copies and carbonless copies.

Although nearly all inkjet, thermal, and laser printers also print closely spaced dots rather than continuous lines or characters, it is not customary to call them dot matrix printers.

Dot matrix printers have one of the lowest printing costs per page.

They are able to use fanfold continuous paper with tractor holes.

Dot matrix printers create noise when the pins or typeface strike the ribbon to the paper, and sound-damping enclosures may have to be used in quiet environments.

They can only print lower-resolution graphics, with limited color performance, limited quality, and lower speeds compared to non-impact printers.

Variations 

The common serial dot matrix printers use a horizontally moving print head. The print head can be thought of featuring a single vertical column of seven or more pins approximately the height of a character box. In reality, the pins are arranged in up to four vertically or/and horizontally slightly displaced columns in order to increase the dot density and print speed through interleaving without causing the pins to jam. Thereby, up to 48 pins can be used to form the characters of a line while the print head moves horizontally. The printing speed of serial dot matrix printers with moving heads varies from 30 to 1550 cps. 

In a considerably different configuration, so called line dot matrix printers use a fixed print head almost as wide as the paper path utilizing a horizontal line of thousands of pins for printing. Sometimes two horizontally slightly displaced rows are used to improve the effective dot density through interleaving. While still line-oriented, these printers for the professional heavy-duty market effectively print a whole line at once while the paper moves forward below the print head. Line matrix printers are capable of printing much more than 1000 cps, resulting in a throughput of up to 800 pages/hour.

A variation on the dot matrix printer was the cross hammer dot printer, patented by Seikosha in 1982. The smooth cylindrical roller of a conventional printer was replaced by a spinning, fluted cylinder. The print head was a simple hammer, with a vertical projecting edge, operated by an electromagnet. Where the vertical edge of the hammer intersected the horizontal flute of the cylinder, compressing the paper and ribbon between them, a single dot was marked on the paper. Characters were built up of multiple dots.

See also 

 Daisy wheel printing
 Dye-sublimation printer
 IBM Proprinter
 Typeball printer
 ESC/P

References

External links 

 Flatbed Dot Matrix Printers 
 Printek
 Erwin Tomash's The U.S. Computer Printer Industry

Impact matrix printers

fr:Imprimante#Imprimante à aiguilles ou Imprimante matricielle